Accomplices (original title: Complices) is a 2009 Franco-Swiss crime thriller film directed by Frédéric Mermoud. The film premiered in competition at the 2009 Locarno International Film Festival. It won the Swiss Film Award for Best Screenplay in 2010.

Plot 
Two police detectives in Lyon, both single and childless, are investigating the murder of a young man called Vince, whose body is found strangled in the river Rhône. It emerges that Vince was a high-end male prostitute, finding clients on the internet and meeting them in hotels. His girlfriend was a student Reb, who he recruited to join him in threesomes, so increasing his range of clients and his earnings. One encounter went wrong when the client started to get rough with Reb, upon which Vince beat him up and the two fled. Furious at the way Reb had been treated, Vince decided to blackmail the man and arranged a rendezvous on the top floor of a multi-storey car park. After handing over the money, the client then attacked Vince with a golf club, upon which Reb waded in with her motorbike helmet. Her blows killed the man, so the two hid his body in his car and fled. Vince's pimp then met him to claim his share of Vince's takings and a fight developed, in which the pimp strangled Vince and then dumped his body in the river. The detectives charge the pimp with murder but not Reb. As she is young, was in love with Vince, is pregnant with his child and her mother is standing by her, they doctor her statement to exonerate her.

Cast 
 Gilbert Melki as Hervé Cagan
 Emmanuelle Devos as Karine Mangin
 Cyril Descours as Vincent Bouvier 
 Nina Meurisse as Rebecca Legendre 
 Joana Preiss as Esther
 Jérémy Kapone as Thomas Morazzini
 Marc Rioufol as Jean-Paul Tardieu
 Yeelem Jappain as Belen
 Clara Ponsot as Lola
 Éric Laugérias as Yvan Cagan
 Serge Larivière as A client
 Anne Loiret as The lawyer
 Frédéric Épaud as A client
 Valérie Lang as Laurence
 Jérémy Azencott as Nicolas Bianchini
 Olivier Guéritée as Mikaël 
 Jean-Pierre Sanchez as Karim

Accolades

References

External links 
 

2009 films
2009 crime thriller films
2000s French-language films
French crime thriller films
Swiss crime thriller films
Films about prostitution in France
Films set in Lyon
Films shot in Lyon
French-language Swiss films
2000s French films